In the Name of the Law was released by Film Booking Offices of America in August 1922.  The feature film's director was Emory Johnson.  Emory was 28 years old when he directed and acted in this film.  It starred veteran actors Ralph Lewis and Claire McDowell. The police melodrama was about a San Francisco police officer.  He was a dedicated community servant. The story depicts his struggles with the duality of dedication to duty versus devotion to family. The film was a pioneering effort in other aspects. It was a serious film about law enforcement. Movies had cinematically maligned the profession in the past. The film is also an early example of an innovative exploitation strategy.  The scheme involved getting the group featured on the screen aligned with their real-life counterparts and promoting the film.

Plot

Prologue
The story's prologue opens when policeman Patrick O'Hara discovers a lost child.  She has stolen some milk.  Rather than disciplining her, he takes her home instead.  The following morning, he finds out the girl has run away from an orphanage. Since their baby daughter had passed away, the O'Haras make plans to adopt the child. The prologue then moves on and features the O'Haras' sons. Ben Alexander plays a young Harry O'Hara at age 10. Harry's younger brother, portrayed by Johnny Thompson,  plays Johnnie O'Hara at age 9.  Josephine Adair plays their recently adopted nine-year-old daughter -  Mary.

12 years later
After a single subtitle, the story jumps 12 years into the future.  Harry is now age 22.  He attends college, studying law hoping to become a lawyer. His lofty goals run contrary to his father's wishes.  His father has told his son he has "wasted his time getting an education."  Johnnie is age 20 and works at the local bank. Mary, age 18, is also employed at the same bank as a stenographer.  Johnnie and Mary have fallen in love and planned their wedding. We also discover the O'Haras have always wanted to own a cottage. The family's frugality has finally come to fruition. They are only one payment away from paying off the mortgage.

While attending law school, Harry earns pocket money by pressing clothes. He also washes dishes. One day, while Harry is at work, somebody leaves a sizable sum of money in a pair of pants needing pressing. The money goes missing and the owner accuses Harry of the theft. The owner reports the thief to the police—the police file charges.  Upon hearing of the accusation, Harry's mother becomes distraught. She had been secretly funding Harry while he attended law school.  In her heart, she knew he couldn't have committed this crime.  Mother O'Hare hatches a plan to keep her eldest out of jail.  She will take the money they had saved for their final payment on the cottage and pass it to Harry.  Harry will "find" the missing money and return it to the owner.

While the family is at home, sans Harry, Pat finds out what his wife has done with their cottage money to save Harry. A massive argument breaks out.  When things settle down, everyone goes their separate ways. While officer O'Hare goes to work, Mary goes to the bank and approaches the bank president. Mr. Lucus, to ask for a loan.  Mr. Lucus agrees to give her the money. But as she finds out, he expects special favors besides the regular repayment. Johnnie takes another tact to help his brother. He decides to tap into a stash of funds stored in his safety deposit box.  After securing the funds, Johnnie heads home to find the house empty.

Where is everybody? Officer O'Hara is at work, mother O'Hara is with Harry, and Mary is begging for a loan.  He heads back to the bank.  Johnnie finds out Mary is flush with cash.  He believes she has stolen the money from the bank to save Harry. A quarrel breaks out.  Now, Johnnie decides to use the funds from his safety deposit box to cover his girlfriend's theft. How could wholesome Mary steal this money?  He starts investigating this supposed theft by looking around the bank.  Johnnie then heads to the back of the bank, further investigating.

The scene switches. The bank is being robbed! Mary's screams alert the bank officials a crime is being committed.  Somebody calls the cops.  Police rush to the bank.  Leading the police continent is officer Pat O'Hare.  After the police arrive, a policeman gets killed in a shoot-out with the robbers. The holdup is thwarted, and all action stops. Twenty-five years on the force have taught officer O'Hara to examine all crime scenes. He performs his due diligence at the crime scene. Officer O'Hare checks the entire bank and then walks around to the back of the bank. In the heat of the moment, he believes he finds another one of the robbers.   Officer O'Hare fires a single shot. Then to his absolute horror, he realizes he has wounded his son - Johnnie.

The story switches to the trial of Johnnie O'Hara for robbery and murder.  The prosecutor's case depends only on circumstantial evidence. Be that as it may, Johnnie is still on the verge of conviction on all counts.  A new lawyer for the defense appears.  The new counselor is none other than Johnnie's brother Harry who is now a full-fledged lawyer. Harry immediately makes a passionate plea for his brother. Harry's eloquence strikes everyone in the courtroom.  Then, Harry finds new direct evidence.  The latest proof exonerates his brother completely - thank you, Mary!

Then, as a precursor to similar scenes from the TV series "Perry Mason," the Bank President, Mr. Lucus, stands up.  Overcome with guilt after hearing Harry's appeals, he confesses to the robbery.  Then he confesses to killing the policeman. Even after his confession, Mr. Lucus is still unable to control his emotions of guilt. He approaches the bench.  While facing the judge, Mr. Lucus pulls a gat and shoots himself.

When the trial concludes, the court dismisses Johnnie's charges. As a side note, the criminal charges filed against Harry are tossed.
When the movie closes, the family believes their luck has changed for the better.  They are convinced misfortune will no longer deal bad cards.

The storyline construction used several sources.

Cast

Prologue
{|
! style="width: 180px; text-align: left;" |  Actor
! style="width: 230px; text-align: left;" |  Role
|-
|Ben Alexander||Harry O'Hara age 10
|-
|Johnny Thompson||Johnnie O'Hara age 8
|-
|Josephine Adair||Mary age 6
|}

12 years later
{|
! style="width: 180px; text-align: left;" |  Actor
! style="width: 230px; text-align: left;" |  Role
|-
|Ralph Lewis||Patrick O'Hara
|-
|Claire McDowell||Mrs. O'Hara
|-
|Emory Johnson||Harry O'Hara age 22
|-
|Johnnie Walker||Johnnie O'Hara age 20
|-
|Ella Hall||Mary age 18
|-
|Richard Morris||Mr. Lucus
|-
|}

Production

Development
Emory Johnson, at the time one of the silver screen's leading men, had recently returned to the San Francisco Bay area to make another movie, based on a story by his mother, Emilie Johnson.  He decided to visit his mother, who lived in the general vicinity.  While driving down San Francisco's Market Street en route, he failed to stop at an intersection. A police officer pulled him to the side.  Emory immediately noticed the policeman's cheerful demeanor. He began to wonder about the officer's home life and how it affected his work. He went on to discuss the idea with his mother, an experienced scenarist, and soon after that, she started to write "The Midnight Call".

Themes
The leading theme of this film was to portray law enforcement in a whole new light. Police were no longer shown as bumbling stumblebums featured in the trendy comedic short subject films of the early part of the 1900s, e.g. Keystone Cops. This movie would portray cops first as family men – real men trying to balance raising a family with the dangerous profession as guardians of the law. It would also show an officer of the law must sometimes seek resolution and balance between enforcing the law no matter the circumstances versus the heartfelt obligations of a family man and father. This duality became the central theme of the film.

Screenplay
Emilie Johnson was Emory Johnson's mother. She was born on June 3, 1867, in Gothenburg, Västra Götaland, Sweden. After emigrating to America, she married Alfred Jönsson.  Their only son was born in 1894 - Alfred Emory Johnson. Emilie Johnson was the writer, screenplay, and story originator on "The Midnight Call." She would have four of her stories shown simultaneously in 1922. After completing this movie, she would write the story for her son's next production - The Third Alarm.

Pre production
Emory Johnson started his acting career early  Broncho Billy Westerns in 1912.  In 1921, he thought the time was right to start directing movies. "In the Name of the Law" was his directorial debut. Before letting a neophyte direct his first film, Emory had a tough sell to his employers on this new humanizing police concept.  FBO were afraid the public wouldn't like a serious side of cops, especially in the form of a full-length movie. He finally convinced them and went on to complete his film.

Filming
This movie was filmed entirely in San Francisco, California.  Some sources indicate the cinematography was handled by both Ross Fisher ASC and Henry Sharp ASC. "Camera" s "Pulse of the Studios" credits the cameraman as "Fisher-Mickle." The cameraman was Ross Fisher.

Schedule
Shooting Schedule according to Camera! "Pulse of the Studios" section:
 Principal photography on "The Midnight Call" began the week of November 28, 1921 at the Brunton Studios in Los Angeles, California.
Emory Johnson travels to San Francisco to shoot scenes and exteriors.
Shooting on "The Midnight Call" continues for the 5th week.
 Post production started the week of January 7, 1922, and continued until March 1922.
 The film was then "shipped East" during the last week of March 1922.
 "The Midnight Call" is listed as "finished" in the first week of April 1922.
The movie title was changed to "In the Name of the Law" sometime in June 1922.

Alternate title
This original movie title was "The Midnight Call." "The Midnight Call" is the correct alternate title for this film. The attached reference suggests they changed the title to "In the Name of the Law" sometime in June 1922. This quote would explain using the new title for the film's premiere in New York on July 9, 1922.

Another alternate title for this movie is incorrectly listed as "The Discard" or "Discard." The mix-up probably occurred because filming started on "The Discard" (name later changed to The Third Alarm) in July 1922. This date would coincide with the July 9 premiere of "In the Name of the Law."

Post production

Studios
The film's controlling studio is listed as "United Studios," not "R-C Studio." The United Studios advertisement states - "... the unlimited facilities, equipment, and highly specialized staff have made the United Studios the most economically operated motion picture plant available to independent producers." The explanation for this is R-C would not have its own filming facilities until 1922.

Advertising
The film's producers, however, had a grander scheme to generate even more revenue. They implemented a promotional strategy that teamed city police departments with local theater owners to promote the film. Most police departments were knowingly on board with the exploitation aspect of the movie. Many local police departments gave the movie free advertising by staging stunts, local police-in-action scenarios, appreciation parades, and other activities drawing attention to the local police force's work.

In many cases, even the local merchants jumped on the promotional bandwagon. The producers also encouraged local merchants to use the officer's graphic holding his hand up to sell their products.

A major part of this exploitation plan was to have movie booking agents get the local police department's cooperation and endorsement before showing the movie in their town. Before this film was released, FBO stated it had 100 letters from police chiefs around the country. The chiefs stated they would fully support the showing of this film in their cities. If the theater had questions on how to exploit this movie, FBO would provide a 22-page newspaper-size campaign book.

Thus, this film had a well-organized and clear strategy of exploitation. Though the word exploitation has a nefarious overtone, in this case, it was mutually self-serving.  The police hoped the film would increase their image from bad-tempered dour automatons to ordinary family men but committed to maintaining the law. This movie also gave police a well-deserved chance to show off what they did and the services they provided.  Often, these police demonstrations were filmed and shown as a prologue to the movie.

There was another critical piece of the exploitation pie.  The New York exploitation included donating a percentage of the movie proceeds to police pension funds, police orphans, police widows, and other police causes. Lastly, as can be seen in the full-page newspaper ad, the local merchants often took advantage of promoting their products.

Release and reception

Official release
On July 6, 1922, the film was copyrighted to R-C (Robertson-Cole) Pictures Corp with a registration number of LP18553. The registered copyrights for FBO Films were with their original British owners. FBO was the official name of the film distributing operation for Robertson-Cole Pictures Corp. Joseph P. Kennedy Sr. would clear this up later The film was officially released for bookings on August 22, 1922.

New York premiere

"In the Name of the Law" had its premiere in New York City on July 9, 1922. It was shown to movie patrons at the George M. Cohan Theater, converted to show movies. Instead of the normal booking for a week, they booked the movie for a month.
Film Booking Offices of America (FBO) claimed they extended the movie to a month, where "Variety" claimed it had booked a month in advance of the showing. FBO and the movie rags wrote about the sizable crowds viewing the movie. "Variety" magazine gave a less glowing but probably more realistic crowd-size report. This information is important because future bookings always referenced sell-out crowds in New York to prove its attraction power.

The New York premiere was the first example of the exploitation potential of the movie. New York had 12,000 police officers on the force at the time. Getting them involved in the advertising this movie proved to be a great success. Also, as part of an agreement to share some of the movie revenues with police causes, Emory Johnson presented each widow of seven police officers that had been killed in the line on duty individual checks for $170.

Reviews
The movie was generally well received.  Most small-town venues loved the movie.  Larger cities like New York and Los Angeles were not swept up in their story or sentimentality, but their police forces certainly took advantage of the exposure.

Melodrama films have plots appealing to the raised passions of the audience. They concentrate on family issues, direct their attention to a victim character, and develop the themes of duty and love. The melodramatic format shows the characters working through their struggles with persistence, sacrificial deeds, and courage.

Movie critics and theater owners often use the following expressions to describe the movies they are reviewing or showing:

In the July 29, 1922 issue of the Exhibitors Herald, the reviewer points outThis is a real old fashioned melodramatic picture, full of thrills, home life stuff, mother love, and exploitation angles sufficient to permit of its being put over in a big way.
Lovers of thrills as dealt out in rapid-fire melodramatic picturization of home life stories will find plenty to satisfy them in "In the Name of the Law."

In the July 22, 1922 issue of the Moving Picture World, Mary Kelly statesAt least one feature about the production is strikingly different.  Burlesque, which has long been considered indispensable in connection with the American policeman's screen, is absent. Here is a sincere human treatment of the side of the life of which the public usually hears nothing.  This should mean very definite success for the picture with the brass-buttoned tribe, as well as the not inconsiderable number of those who have always been in close sympathy with the policeman and his troubles. 
Picture of family's life with strong dramatic touches should have broad appeal

In the July 22, 1922 issue of the Motion Picture News, Laurence Reid observesThey have tacked a magnetic, seat-selling title to this picture. With proper exploitation certain to be given by those exhibitors who believe in advertising, there is no reason FBO would feel worried over the returns.
The only fault which we found with it is the rather arbitrary leaning of the director in shaping a melodramatic finish - a result which reveals the characters as not over-blessed with imagination.

Preservation status

A report created by film historian and archivist David Pierce for the Library of Congress claims:
75% of original silent-era films have perished.
14% of the 10,919 silent films released by major studios exist in their original 35mm or other formats.
11% survive in full-length foreign versions or on film formats of lesser image quality. Many silent-era films did not survive for reasons as explained on this Wikipedia page.

Emory Johnson directed 13 films, 11 were silent, and 2 were Talkies.
In The Name of the Law was the first film in Emory Johnson's eight-picture contract with FBO. The film's original length is listed at 7 reels. According to the Library of Congress website, this film has a current status of "No holdings located in archives," thus it is presumed all copies of this film are lost.

Gallery

Film labels
Though the film is lost, over time, it has acquired labels such as police drama, sports film, and a police drama starting baseball legend Honus Wagner. Even today, many websites refer to "In the Name of the Law," featuring Honus Wagner catching baseballs thrown from a building roof.

Honus Wagner connection
Several websites claim Honus Wagner had a role in this film. Pittsburgh Pirates retired baseball superstar Honus Wagner did not take part in any of the writing, production, direction, nor did he have any major or minor roles in the film's production. The confusion occurred when Honus Wagner participated in the movie exploitation campaign staged in Pittsburgh, Pennsylvania. The overall campaign's objective was to get the local police departments involved in the promotion of this police film. Thus, Wagner did assist in promoting this film along with the Pittsburgh Police department.

Many police departments participated in promoting this film when it landed in their jurisdictions. As stated above, the movie first premiered in New York and became the first practice run at exploiting this movie. This first exploitation included the participation of two New York baseball superstars. This promotion has a direct tie-in to the Honus Wagner stunt. The following is a quote from an article published in the July issue of the "Moving Picture World":

The attention of all Broadway was focused on the picture during the noon hour on Monday, July 17th, when "Babe" Ruth and Bob Meusel performed a ball-throwing act in the center of Times Square, to aid the run of the picture, a part of the receipts of which will be given to police widows and orphans.

This film was released in August 1922, and Pittsburgh scheduled its first showing in September. FBO coordinated with the Pittsburgh police department to promote the film and launched an exploitation campaign. The promotion started on Monday, September 11, 1922. "Hollywood cameramen" filmed the Superintendent of Police and his staff along with other policemen in action. Shown below is the schedule for the Pittsburgh promotion.  Note - activity scheduled for Friday, September 15.

Thus, on a September afternoon in 1922, a retired baseball superstar caught baseballs tossed from a city building roof. This attraction, along with "thousands" of spectators watching the event, was captured on film, photographed by local newspapers, and shown as a prologue to this attraction. Somehow, Honus Wagner's stunt became inextricably intertwined with this movie.

Displayed below are three photographs from the Pittsburgh event.

References

External links

 
 In the Name of the Law the AFI Catalog of Feature Movies
  has the Honus Wager reference
 In The Name Of The Law / Emory Johnson (motion picture)  Performing Arts Encyclopedia, Library of Congress
 
 

1922 lost films
1922 films
1922 drama films
American action adventure films
American adventure films
American drama films
American crime drama films
American crime thriller films
American black-and-white films
American mystery thriller films
American silent feature films
1920s English-language films
Film Booking Offices of America films
Films about lawyers
Films set in San Francisco
Lost American films
Lost drama films
Melodrama films
Films directed by Emory Johnson
1920s American films
Silent American drama films
Silent adventure films
Silent mystery films
Silent thriller films